Ong Leong Boon (Chinese: 王龍文; 1946 – 5 February 2023),  an orthopaedic surgeon, served as the Member of Parliament  for Kim Seng SMC in Singapore from 1972 to 1980.

Early life
Ong was born in Singapore, and studied at Raffles Institution. He entered the University of Singapore to study medicine. In 1966, the fourth year student was elected president of the University of Singapore Student's Union. He met the Prime Minister during the government's multiple dialog sessions with the varsity students.

Medical career
From 1983 until retirement in 2008, Ong was in private practice at his orthopaedic surgery clinic.

In 1981, Ong founded the Asean Orthopaedic Association and served as secretary general, and was also the president of the Singapore Orthopaedic Association in 1983.

Political career 
Ong joined the People's Action Party to contest the general election in 1972. He won 8,178 votes (67.74%), and became the member of Parliament for Kim Seng. In 1976, he successfully defended his seat with 10,975 votes (77.65%), and became the Member of Parliament, for Kim Seng.

In 1980, he stepped down from politics to return to private medical practice.

Other career 
Ong was also involved in philanthropy and sports communities:
 Singapore Lawn Tennis Association - (1970s to 1990s)
 Singapore Golf Association - president (2006-2010)
 Children's Charities Association of Singapore - deputy chairman (1988-1989)

Private life
Ong married Mildred Tao in 1974.

References

1946 births
2023 deaths
Singaporean orthopedic surgeons
Singaporean people of Hokkien descent
People's Action Party politicians
Members of the Parliament of Singapore
Raffles Institution alumni
University of Singapore alumni